Desmond L. Oliver (born December 4, 1969) is an American college basketball coach who most recently served as the head coach at East Tennessee State University.

Playing career
Oliver played collegiately for one season at Genesee Community College under Bill Van Gundy, the father of Jeff and Stan, before transferring to Dominican College in New York, where he served as a team captain.

Coaching career
In 1994, Oliver began his college coaching career as an assistant at Niagara where he stayed until 1997 before taking an assistant coaching position under Tony Barone at Texas A&M. Oliver would return to New York with stops at Cornell and St. Bonaventure before joining Bonnies' head coach Jim Baron at Rhode Island where he'd stay as an assistant from 2001 to 2004. From 2004 to 2009, Oliver was an assistant under Dennis Felton at Georgia and the Bulldogs' 11th place squad that won the 2008 SEC tournament title and the auto bid to the 2008 NCAA tournament. 

After his time at Georgia, Oliver briefly served as an assistant coach at Canisius before a five-year stint as an assistant at Charlotte. In 2015, Oliver moved on to Tennessee to join Rick Barnes where he'd earn a reputation as one of the top recruiters in college basketball. While with the Volunteers, Oliver was on staff for a SEC regular season title in 2017–18 and a Sweet 16 appearance in 2019.

On April 5, 2021 Oliver was named the 18th head coach in East Tennessee State basketball history.

Head coaching record

References

External links 
 Desmond Oliver on Twitter
 East Tennessee State profile
 Tennessee profile
 Charlotte profile

1969 births
Living people
Sportspeople from Buffalo, New York
Basketball players from Buffalo, New York
Basketball coaches from New York (state)
Dominican Chargers men's basketball players
High school basketball coaches in New York (state)
Niagara Purple Eagles men's basketball coaches
Texas A&M Aggies men's basketball coaches
Cornell Big Red men's basketball coaches
St. Bonaventure Bonnies men's basketball coaches
Rhode Island Rams men's basketball coaches
Georgia Bulldogs basketball coaches
Canisius Golden Griffins men's basketball coaches
Charlotte 49ers men's basketball coaches
Tennessee Volunteers basketball coaches
East Tennessee State Buccaneers men's basketball coaches